Tricadia Capital Management, LLC ("Tricadia Capital") was a New York based asset management company. As of July 17, 2020, its primary website is offline.

History
Tricadia Capital is a multi-strategy credit manager for hedge funds and alternative investment accounts. Tricadia Capital’s predecessor was formed in 2003 by Michael Barnes and Arif Inayatullah. Tricadia Capital is a wholly owned subsidiary of Tricadia Holdings, L.P. (“Tricadia Holdings”), which is controlled by Messrs, Barnes and Inayatullah. Tricadia Holdings also owns Tricadia CDO Management, LLC. Tricadia Holdings is associated with Mariner Investment Group, LLC, which provides certain support services for the firm.

Before founding Tricadia Holdings, Mr. Barnes had worked at UBS and Paine Webber,  and Bear Stearns. Mr. Inayatullah had worked at UBS, BroadStreet Group, and Credit Agricole Indosuez.

In December 2018, Management of Tricadia Capital is closing its hedge funds. The closures come after assets plummeted from a high of over $4 billion in 2014 in its flagship credit strategy. Tricadia will return around $800 million to investors in its Credit Strategy Fund and the company has already given customers over $150 million to its Convexity fund.

In August 2019, Tricadia buys First Midwest Bancorp Inc, iShares Core S&P 500 ETF. As of the 2nd Quarter of 2019, Tricadia Capital Management, LLC owns 3 stocks with value totalling $43 million.

Synthetic CDO
In 2004, Tricadia CDO Management, LLC was the first North American organization to issue a "synthetic CDO-squared" deal, which it did in conjunction with Citibank.

References

Companies based in New York City
Financial services companies established in 2003
Investment management companies of the United States